Susan Lee, Sue Lee, Susie Lee, or Suzanne Lee  could refer to:

Susan C. Lee (born 1954), American politician
Sue French-Lee (born 1960), Canadian long-distance runner
Susan Lee (rowing) (born 1966), Australian rowing coxswain
Susie Lee (born 1966), American politician
Suzanne Lee (born 1970), American fashion designer
Sunny (singer) (Susan Soonkyu Lee) (born 1989), Korean-American singer